Hobbs House may refer to:

Thomas Hobbs Jr. House, North Berwick, Maine
Hobbs Brook Basin Gate House, Waltham, Massachusetts, NRHP-listed
Isaac Hobbs House, Weston, Massachusetts, NRHP-listed
Marcus Hobbs House, Worcester, Massachusetts, NRHP-listed
Clarke–Hobbs–Davidson House, Hendersonville, North Carolina, NRHP-listed in Henderson County 
Falls–Hobbs House, Statesville, North Carolina, NRHP-listed in Iredell County